In early May 2003, a series of widespread and devastating tornado outbreaks affected much of the Central and Eastern United States. Environmental conditions were unusually conducive to a prolonged period of severe weather, driven by a persistent upper-level trough across the Intermountain West. This feature in the upper atmosphere provided significant wind shear during each day of the outbreak series. Meanwhile, moist air from the Gulf of Mexico surged northward across the country, providing the moisture and instability needed to fuel tornadic activity. This combination of factors persisted every day from May 3 to May 11.

The most consequential day of the severe weather event occurred on May 4, when a votaile atmospheric setup produced numerous strong to violent tornadoes across Arkansas, Kansas, Missouri, Oklahoma, and adjacent areas. A total of 79 tornadoes were documented that day, the second most on record at the time, behind only the 1974 Super Outbreak. In particular, a swarm of tornadoes affected the Kansas City, Missouri, metropolitan area, resulting in dozens of fatalities and hundreds of injuries. On May 8, a violent tornado also affected the Oklahoma City, Oklahoma, suburbs and caused numerous casualties. Fatalities were recorded on May 4, May 6, May 9, and May 11, while every day except May 3 recorded at least one injury due to a tornado.

A total of 42 people were killed, and an additional 652 people were injured. Total damage reached $4.1 billion (2003 USD). In all, 363 tornadoes were confirmed over an eight day period. Posthumous analysis of the event suggested an extended outbreak of that magnitude occurs roughly every 10–100 years. The tornado event cemented May 2003 as the most prolific month for United States tornado activity on record, until it was surpassed in April 2011.

Confirmed tornadoes

See also
 Tornadoes of 2003
 Tornado outbreak sequence of May 2003

Notes

References

Tornadoes in Oklahoma
Tornadoes of 2003
May 2003 events in the United States
2003 natural disasters in the United States
Tornadoes in Kansas
Tornadoes in Missouri
Tornadoes in Texas
Tornadoes in Nebraska
Tornadoes in South Dakota
Tornadoes in Arkansas
Tornadoes in Tennessee
Tornadoes in Illinois
Tornadoes in Kentucky
Tornadoes in Mississippi
Tornadoes in South Carolina
Tornadoes in Alabama
Tornadoes in Georgia (U.S. state)
Tornadoes in Maryland
Tornadoes in Colorado
Tornadoes in Virginia
Tornadoes in North Carolina
Tornadoes in Indiana
Tornadoes in Iowa
Tornadoes in Pennsylvania